Phyllogobius platycephalops, the Slender spongegoby, is a species of goby native to the western Indian Ocean and the western Pacific Ocean where it occurs on reefs at depths of from .  This species is a commensal on sponges of the genus Phyllospongia.  This species grows to a length of  SL.  This species is the only known member of its genus.

References

Gobiidae
Monotypic fish genera
Fish described in 1964